A statue of Massasoit by Cyrus E. Dallin is installed outside the Utah State Capitol in Salt Lake City, Utah, United States.

References

External links

Monuments and memorials in Utah
Outdoor sculptures in Salt Lake City
Sculptures of men in Utah
Sculptures of Native Americans
Statues in Utah
Works by Cyrus Edwin Dallin